The men's 110 metres hurdles was the shorter of two hurdling events at the 1908 Summer Olympics in London. It was dominated by the American runners. The competition was held from Thursday, July 23, 1908, to Saturday, July 25, 1908. 25 hurdlers from ten nations competed. NOCs could enter up to 12 athletes. The event was won by Forrest Smithson of the United States, the fourth of five consecutive victories for the nation in the first five Olympic Games. It was also the third of four consecutive podium sweeps for the Americans in the event.

Background

This was the fourth appearance of the event, which is one of 12 athletics events to have been held at every Summer Olympics. None of the hurdlers from 1904 returned. The Americans were favored, but it was difficult to determine which one. Forrest Smithson was the winner of the 1907 AAU title and Western Olympic trials; Arthur Shaw was the 1908 AAU and IC4A champion; John Garrels was the 1907 IC4A champion and Central Olympic trials winner; and Leonard Howe had won the Eastern Olympic trials.

Belgium, Canada, Norway, South Africa, and Sweden each made their first appearance in the event, as did the combined Australia/New Zealand team "Australasia" (though Australia had competed in 1904). The United States made its fourth appearance, the only nation to have competed in the 110 metres hurdles in each Games to that point.

Competition format

There were three rounds for the first time. The first round consisted of 14 heats, many of which had only one hurdler and none of which had more than three. The top hurdler in each heat advanced to the semifinals. The 14 semifinalists were divided into four semifinals of 3 or 4 runners each; again, only the top hurdler advanced to the 4-man final.

Ten sets of hurdles were set on the course.

Records

These were the standing world and Olympic records (in seconds) prior to the 1908 Summer Olympics.

(*) unofficial 120 yards (= 109.73 m)

Forrest Smithson equalled the Olympic record when he ran 15.4 seconds in his semifinal. In the final he set the first official world record (ratified by the IAAF in 1912) in this event with 15.0 seconds.

Schedule

Results

Round 1

The first round heats were held on July 23, 1908, making the short hurdles one of the last events to begin. The Americans won every race in which they competed. The British team also had a strong showing, winning any time that there was no American in the race.

Heat 1

Healey won by four yards after leading from the start.

Heat 2

Garrels won by seven yards.

Heat 3

Groenings led by five yards at the finish.

Heat 4

Kiely had no competition in the first round.

Heat 5

Rand and Powell were even for most of the race. Powell hit the ninth hurdle, slowing him just enough for Rand to take the lead and win.

Heat 6

Lemming fell during the race, allowing Walters to win while easing up.

Heat 7

The seventh heat was another in which there was no competition.

Heat 8

Halbart won without competition.

Heat 9

Ahearne was the fourth runner to win without a contest.

Heat 10

Smithson won by ten yards.

Heat 11

Blijstad fell, allowing Hussey to win with a jog.

Heat 12

Kinahan had an easy win by ten yards.

Heat 13

Howe and Leader were even over the hurdles, but Howe edged out Leader in the straight.

Heat 14

Shaw won without a contest.

Semifinals

The semifinal round was held on July 24, 1908. Each of the four heats of the second round were won by American runners.

Semifinal 1

Shaw took the lead at the first set of hurdles, finishing about five metres ahead of Hussey.

Semifinal 2

Smithson had no trouble winning this heat, tying the Olympic record as he did so.

Semifinal 3

Healey led for most of the race, with Rand close behind, but Healey was unable to clear the ninth hurdle cleanly, allowing Rand to pass him and win by a foot.

Semifinal 4

Halbert pulled up lame, and Garrels won by 15 yards.

Final

Smithson pulled away from his countrymen at every set of hurdles to win by five meters and set a new world record.

References

Notes
 
 
 

Men's hurdles 110 metres
Sprint hurdles at the Olympics